Cara Black and Liezel Huber were the defending champions; however, they lost in the semifinals 4–6, 6–2, [9–11], against Květa Peschke and Katarina Srebotnik. 
Nuria Llagostera Vives and María José Martínez Sánchez won in the finals 7–6(5), 6–4 against Květa Peschke and Katarina Srebotnik.

Seeds
The top four seeds receive a bye into the second round.

Draw

Finals

Top half

Bottom half

External links
Main Draw Doubles

Dubai Tennis Championships - Women's Doubles
2010 Dubai Tennis Championships